The Karajan Gold series is a collection of thirty classic digital Deutsche Grammophon recordings by the 20th century Austrian conductor Herbert von Karajan.

References

Album series